Drag Latina is a Latin American reality competition television series. The series premiered on 16 October 2022 and is broadcast through Revry.

In December 2021, Ninel Conde was confirmed to host the reality competition series. In September 2022, the competition series was revealed from Revry. The cast was officially revealed through social media in September 2022, which is a total of ten contestants competing the title of "Drag Latina". With the announcement of the series, it was confirmed that Fedro will be judging.

Contestants

Contestant progress 

Legend:

Lip syncs 

Legend:

Episodes

References

External links 
 

LGBT in Latin America
Upcoming television series
2020s American LGBT-related television series
Reality competition television series
2020s LGBT-related reality television series
2022 in LGBT history